Campaign for Socialism (CfS) is an autonomous pressure group of Scottish Labour Party members and supporters who campaign for left-wing policies and candidates within the party. In 2016, CfS agreed to a joint membership scheme with Momentum, a UK-wide grassroots movement supportive of Jeremy Corbyn and his leadership of the Labour Party.

History 
CfS was originally established in 1994 to campaign against the removal of Clause IV from the Labour Party's constitution. By 2012, it was one of the only remaining ideological-based groupings in the party  but Gerry Hassan and Eric Shaw, writing that year, claimed that CfS "has few members, little organisational presence and has had a negligible influence on the direction of the party".

CfS played a key role in organising Neil Findlay and Katy Clark's leadership bid in the 2014 Scottish Labour leadership election. Though unsuccessful, CfS claims the campaign "built the foundations for Jeremy [Corbyn]'s campaign just a few months later" by "giving many new, young volunteers experience and a network of contacts across the country that would help quickly mobilise an effective campaign".

In 2016, Scottish Labour Young Socialists  founded in 2015  became CfS's official youth wing.

In 2017, five CfS members won seats on the Scottish Labour Party's national executive. They called for the then Scottish Labour leader, Kezia Dugdale, to pursue a socialist agenda and work more closely with Jeremy Corbyn's team.

CfS endorsed Richard Leonard to be the next leader of Scottish Labour following the resignation of Kezia Dugdale in August 2017. Leonard went on to win the leadership with 56.7% of the vote.

In the 2021 Scottish Labour leadership election the CfS endorsed Monica Lennon to be the next leader of Scottish Labour following Richard Leonard's resignation in January 2021. She lost the election to Anas Sarwar, gaining 42.4% of the vote to his 57.6%.

Notable members of CfS include: former Convenor Elaine Smith MSP, current Convenor Neil Findlay MSP, former MP Hugh Gaffney (2017–2019), and Pauline Bryan.

References

External links

1994 establishments in Scotland
Democratic socialism
Social democracy
Organisations associated with the Labour Party (UK)
Political party factions in Scotland
Scottish Labour
Socialist organisations in the United Kingdom